Farmersville is an unincorporated community in Chattooga County, in the U.S. state of Georgia.

History
A post office was established at Farmersville in 1853, and remained in operation until it was discontinued in 1866.

References

Unincorporated communities in Chattooga County, Georgia
Unincorporated communities in Georgia (U.S. state)